Esoteric Warfare is the fifth full-length studio album by Norwegian black metal band Mayhem. It was released by Season of Mist on 6 June 2014 in Europe and Asia, and on 10 June 2014 in North America. It is the band's first album with Teloch on guitar since Blasphemer's departure from the band in 2008.

Background
The album was initially announced in a 2012 interview with the bass guitarist Necrobutcher with Blabbermouth.net. On 2 August 2013, the drummer Hellhammer announced on Mayhem's official Facebook page that he was then recording his drum parts for the album. Mayhem announced in November 2013 that the album had entered the mixing process and that they expected to release it in early 2014. On 18 February 2014, it was announced that a teaser 7" single containing the track "Psywar" would be released on 25 April 2014. On 19 February 2014, Mayhem's record label, Season of Mist, announced that the new album's title would be Esoteric Warfare and its release date was to be 6 June 2014. On 19 March 2014, Blabbermouth.net unveiled the album's official track listing along with other details.

Writing and recording 
The album was recorded and mixed between September and October in 2013. While the drums were recorded in Mølla Studio, the rest of the album was recorded in SleikBallaMi in Oslo. After recording was finished, the band returned to Mølla Studio where mixing was handled by Knut Møllarn from Arcturus. The album was mastered by Maor Applebaum in the US. Much of the album was written by new guitarist Teloch, while the lyrics were handled by vocalist Attila and Cern Abyss. He said that "my problem with this album was to write an album that would be fitting to release after 'Ordo ad Chao.' First, I wrote almost a whole album, but it was too much back to the roots, and try to top 'Ordo' for me as a songwriter was not a option either--that would be suicide for me as songwriter for them." The band actually recorded many of the aforementioned songs, but they were scrapped as Teloch was ultimately not satisfied with them, and the band started over.

According to Attila, the band wanted to make an album that "sounded like Mayhem." He said that "After the Ordo album, which was a little bit progressive—maybe a little bit too much—almost like a fusion album where riffs were not repeated and the rhythm was always out or different or kind of twisted, we wanted to go back from there instead of going forward in that direction. Every Mayhem album has a kind of unique aspect, but we wanted to go back to a little bit more traditional extreme metal. Of course, there’s all these elements that Mayhem has built up for itself as a band, but we still wanted to go back to something that was straightforward musically and a little more brutal and more like extreme metal."

As with the previous album, the lyrics focus less on the classically Satanic themes of the band's early work, instead referring to occult and conspiracy theory concepts such as psychic powers, mind control and alien tampering with human evolution. (For instance, the song "Corpse of Care" appears to be a direct allusion to Bohemian Grove and the Cremation of Care ceremony performed there.)

"I am become Death, the destroyer of worlds." by J. Robert Oppenheimer serves as the intro for the song Trinity which is also the code name assigned by Oppenheimer for the first detonation of a nuclear weapon.

Like its predecessor Ordo Ad Chao, the album has some death metal sound and death grunt vocals. The album style has more blackened death metal sound than any of its predecessors.

Critical reception

Upon its release, Esoteric Warfare received positive reviews from music critics. At Metacritic, which assigns a normalized rating out of 100 to reviews from critics, the album received an average score of 69, which indicates "generally favorable reviews", based on 4 reviews. Pitchfork wrote: "After 30 years, Esoteric Warfare is a Mayhem album worth talking about more for its sounds than its associated baggage." Sputnikmusic staff writer Voivod thought: "Despite being derivative, Esoteric Warfare is worthy of praise, because it keeps alive a sound practised by merely a handful of outfits, some of them sadly disbanded." Nevertheless, Alex Franquelli of PopMatters was more mixed in his assessment of the album, stating: "Mayhem are clearly trying to push the envelope of their metal, but their efforts are rendered vain by the lack of derring-do which has sealed the fate of other fellow second-wave black metallers."

Personnel
Mayhem
 Attila — vocals, lyrics, producer
 Necrobutcher — bass guitar
 Hellhammer — drums
 Teloch — guitar, music, producer, recording engineer
 Ghul — guitar

Additional personnel
 Christian Fleck (aka CERN) — lyrics 
 Zbigniew Bielak — cover art
 Maor Appelbaum — Mastering Engineer
 Mollarn — recording engineer, mixing
 Ester Segarra — photography

Chart performance

Weekly charts

References

2014 albums
Mayhem (band) albums
Season of Mist albums